Two dynasties, the Taibugha and the Shaybanid dynasty of Sibir ruled the Khanate one after the other, bringing breaks in each other's continuity of rule.

Yermak Timofeyevich, a Cossack led the first campaign of Russian conquest of Siberia in the reign of Ivan the Terrible 1580-82 C.E. However, Kuchum Khan returned briefly and attacked Yermak on August 6, 1584 in the dead of night and killed most of his army. Finally, in August 1598 Küçhüm Khan was defeated at the Battle of Urmin near the River Ob. In the course of the fight the Siberian royal family were captured by the Russians. However, Küçhüm Khan escaped yet again. The Russians took the family members of Küçhüm Khan to Moscow and there they remained as hostages. The descendants of the khan's family became known as the Princes Sibirsky and the family is known to have survived until at least the late 19th Century. The struggle for dominance in the region continued for several years by the Taibughid successor Syed Ahmed Khan and the Shaybanid successor Ali ibn Kuchum Khan as well as the Russians.

Family of Taibugha
Taibuga
Khoja
Mar (son of Khoja) (Umar, Omar) - (his sister married to Ibak Khan (1450? - 1480?))
Obder (Oder, Ader) - Mar's son (died in Ibak Khan's captivity) 
Mamuq - son of Obder (1496? - 1502?)
 Qasim of Sibir (son of Mamuq (1502-1530)
 Yadgar (son of Qasim) (1530-1563)
 Bekbulat (son of Qasim) - a possible co-ruler (1555-1558), a possible father of Simeon Bekbulatovich؟
 Syed Ahmed Khan (1583 - 1588)
Abalak (Yabalak, Ebalak) - Mar's son
Angish (Agishev, Aguish) - Abalak's son

Musa Bies - a possible Khan of Sibir? (1460-1496).

 Munch-Timur: 1359
 Ali Bey Khan: 1359-1375
 Giyath-ud-din Kagan Bey: 1375-1396
 Tokhtamysh: 1396-1406
 Zhumaduk: 1406-1421
 Mahmud Khoja: 1421
 Khizr: 1421
 Qazi Muhammad Khan: 1421-1428
 Abul-Khayr Khan: 1428-1464
 Ibaq Khan: 1464-1495
 Mamuq of Kazan: 1495-1502
 Kuluk Sultan: 1502-1530
 Jediger : 1552-1563
 Kuchum: 1563-1598
 Ali: 1598-1604

Sources
 Russian Wikipedia

Khanate of Sibir
Sibir
History of Siberia